Ibaraki 4th district (茨城県第4区 Ibaraki-ken dai-yon-ku or 茨城4区 Ibaraki 4-ku) is a single-member constituency of the House of Representatives in the Diet of Japan. It is located in Northern Ibaraki and consists of the cities of Hitachinaka, Hitachiōta, Hitachiōmiya (without the former village of Gozenyama), Naka and the Naka and Kuji counties. As of 2012, 303,835 eligible voters were registered in the district.

Before the electoral reform of 1994, the area was part of the multi-member Ibaraki 2nd district where three Representatives had been elected by single non-transferable vote.

Ibaraki 4th district is a "conservative kingdom" (hoshu ōkoku), a stronghold of the Liberal Democratic Party (LDP). It wasn't even contested by the main opposition Democratic Party in the 2000 and 2003 general elections and withstood the Democratic landslide victory in the election of 2009. Since its creation the district has been represented by the Kajiyama family for the LDP: former Trade, Home, Justice Minister and Chief Cabinet Secretary Seiroku Kajiyama (Obuchi faction) and his son Hiroshi (no faction).

List of representatives

Election results

References 

Ibaraki Prefecture
Districts of the House of Representatives (Japan)